Robert Rich, 3rd Baron Rich, 1st Earl of Warwick (December 1559 – 24 March 1619), was an English nobleman, known as Baron Rich between 1581 and 1618, when he was created Earl of Warwick. He was the first husband of Penelope Devereux, whom he divorced in 1605 on the grounds of her adultery.

Origins
Rich was the son and heir of Robert Rich, 2nd Baron Rich (c. 1538–1581) by his wife Elizabeth Baldry, a daughter of George Baldry. He was the grandson of Richard Rich, 1st Baron Rich, the progenitor of the powerful Rich family.

Career
Rich succeeded his father in the barony in 1581. In 1618, he was created Earl of Warwick.

Marriages and progeny
He married twice:
His first marriage was on 10 January 1581 to Lady Penelope Devereux (January 1563 – 7 July 1607), a daughter of Walter Devereux, 1st Earl of Essex. In 1605, Lord Rich was granted a divorce from his wife, who admitted adultery with Charles Blount, 8th Baron Mountjoy. By Penelope, Rich had seven children:
 Robert Rich, 2nd Earl of Warwick (1587–1658), eldest son and heir.
 Henry Rich, 1st Earl of Holland (1590–1649), second son.
 Sir Charles Rich (d. 1627), died unmarried and without issue
 Lettice Rich (d. 1619), named after her maternal grandmother Lettice Knollys. Married firstly (as his second wife) Sir George Carey (c.1541-1616) of Cockington in the parish of Tor Mohun in Devon, Lord Deputy of Ireland, without issue; secondly to Sir Arthur Lake, MP.
 Penelope Rich, married Gervase Clifton, 1st Baronet
 Essex Rich, married Sir Thomas Cheek and had three sons and five daughters
 Isabella Rich, married Sir John Smythe, son of Sir Thomas Smythe, first Governor of the East India Company.

His second marriage, in 1616, was to Frances Wray (1568–1634), widow of Sir George St Paul, 1st Baronet, and second daughter of Sir Christoper Wray, Lord Chief Justice to Queen Elizabeth I. Wray was described as "a person of shining conversation and eminent bounty"; she survived her second husband and in her second widowhood was one of the richest women in Lincolnshire. Neither of her marriages produced children. She died at Snarford in 1634 aged 66.

Death and succession
He died in March 1619, aged 59, and was succeeded in the earldom by his eldest son Robert Rich, 2nd Earl of Warwick (1587–1658).

References

Earls of Warwick (1618 creation)
Robert
1559 births
1619 deaths
Rich, Robert
16th-century English nobility
17th-century English nobility